Henry Allan (6 January 1846 – 26 April 1926) was an Australian cricketer. He played one first-class match for New South Wales in 1871/72.

See also
 List of New South Wales representative cricketers

References

External links
 

1846 births
1926 deaths
Australian cricketers
New South Wales cricketers
People from Westminster